Ptolemy of Mauretania (Ptolemaîos; ; 13 9BC–AD40) was the last Roman client king and ruler of Mauretania for Rome. He was the son of Juba II, the king of Numidia and a member of the Berber Massyles tribe, as well as a descendant of the Ptolemaic dynasty via his mother Cleopatra Selene II.

Early life 

Ptolemy was the son of King Juba II and Queen Cleopatra Selene II of Mauretania. His birth date is not certainly known but must have occurred before his mother's death, which has been estimated to have taken place in 5BC. He had a sister (possibly younger) who is evidenced by an Athenian inscription, but her name has not been preserved. She may have been called Drusilla.

His father Juba II was the son of King Juba I of Numidia, who was descended from the Berbers of North Africa and was an ally to the Roman Triumvir Pompey. His mother Cleopatra Selene II was the daughter of the Ptolemaic Greek Queen Cleopatra VII of Egypt and the Roman Triumvir Mark Antony. Ptolemy was of Berber, Greek and Roman ancestry. Ptolemy and his sister were the only known children of Juba II and Cleopatra Selene II to reach maturity, and were among the younger grandchildren to Mark Antony. Through his maternal grandfather, Ptolemy was distantly related to Julius Caesar and the Julio-Claudian dynasty. Ptolemy was a first cousin to Germanicus and the Roman Emperor Claudius and a second cousin to the Emperor Caligula, the Empress Agrippina the Younger, the Empress Valeria Messalina and the Emperor Nero.

Ptolemy was most probably born in Caesaria, the capital of the Kingdom of Mauretania (modern Cherchell, Algeria) in the Roman Empire. He was named in honor of his mother's ancestors, in particular the Ptolemaic dynasty. He was also named in honor of the memory of Cleopatra VII, the birthplace of his mother and the birthplace of her relatives. In choosing her son's name, Cleopatra Selene II created a distinct Greek-Egyptian tone and emphasized her role as the monarch who would continue the Ptolemaic dynasty. She by-passed the ancestral names of her husband. By naming her son Ptolemy instead of a Berber ancestral name, she offers an example rare in ancient history, especially in the case of a son who is the primary male heir, of reaching into the mother's family instead of the father's for a name. This emphasized the idea that his mother was the heiress of the Ptolemies and the leader of a Ptolemaic government in exile.

Through his parents, Ptolemy had Roman citizenship, and they sent him to Rome to be educated. His mother likely died in 5BC and was placed in the Royal Mausoleum of Mauretania, built by his parents. In Rome, Ptolemy received a good Roman education. He was part of the remarkable court of his maternal aunt Antonia Minor, an influential aristocrat who presided over a circle of various princes and princesses which assisted in the political preservation of the Roman Empire's borders and affairs of the client states. Antonia Minor, the youngest daughter of Mark Antony and the youngest niece of Emperor Augustus, was a half-sister of Ptolemy's late mother, also a daughter of Mark Antony. Antonia Minor's mother was Octavia Minor, Mark Antony's fourth wife and the second sister of Octavian (later Augustus). Ptolemy lived in Rome until the age of 21, when he returned to the court of his aging father in Mauretania.

Reign
When Ptolemy returned to Mauretania, JubaII made Ptolemy his co-ruler and successor. Coinage has survived from JubaII's co-rule with his son. On coinage, on one side is a central bust of JubaII with his title in Latin ‘King Juba’. On the other side is a central bust of Ptolemy and the inscription stating in Latin ‘King Ptolemy son of Juba’. JubaII died in 23 and was placed alongside Cleopatra SeleneII in the Royal Mausoleum of Mauretania. Ptolemy then became the sole ruler of Mauretania.

During his co-rule with JubaII, and into his sole rule, Ptolemy, like his father, appeared to be a patron of art, learning, literature and sports. In Athens, Greece, statues were erected to JubaII and Ptolemy in a gymnasium, and a statue was erected in Ptolemy's honor in reference to his taste in literature. Ptolemy dedicated statues of himself on the Acropolis. The Athenians honored Ptolemy and his family with inscriptions dedicated to them, and this reveals that the Athenians had respect towards the Roman Client Monarchs and their families, which was common in the 1st century.

In the year 17, the local Berber tribes, the Numidian Tacfarinas and Garamantes, started to revolt against the Kingdom of Mauretania and Rome. The war had ravaged Africa, and Berber forces included former slaves from Ptolemy's household who had joined in the revolt. Ptolemy through his military campaigns was unsuccessful in ending the Berber revolt. The war reached the point where Ptolemy summoned the Roman governor of Africa, Publius Cornelius Dolabella, and his army to assist him in ending the revolt. The war ended in the year 24. Although Ptolemy's army and the Romans won, both parties suffered considerable losses of infantry and cavalry.

The Roman Senate, impressed by Ptolemy's loyal conduct, had sent a Roman senator to visit him. The Roman senator recognized Ptolemy's loyal conduct and awarded him an ivory scepter, an embroidered triumphal robe, and the senator greeted Ptolemy as king, ally, and friend. This recognition was a tradition which recognized and rewarded the allies of Rome.

Ptolemy, through his military campaigns, had proven his capability and loyalty as an ally and Client King to Rome. He was a popular monarch with the Berbers and had travelled extensively throughout the Roman Empire, including Alexandria, Egypt and Ostia, Italy.

In Caesaria, prayers were offered for the health of Ptolemy at the Temple of Saturn frugifer dues. Mauretania was a region that was abundant in agriculture, and a god considered equivalent to Saturn was the god of agriculture. This cult was an important one in the kingdom. A temple and a sanctuary were dedicated to Saturn in Caesaria by 30 and, throughout Mauretania, various temples were dedicated to Saturn.

His mother originated from Egypt, where there were various imperial cults dedicated to the Pharaohs and their relatives, and there is a possibility that his father's Royal Numidian ancestors may have had imperial cults dedicated to them.

A surviving inscription in Mauretania hints that either JubaII or Ptolemy established an imperial cult honoring Hiempsal II, a previous Numidian King and paternal grandfather of JubaII. According to inscription evidence, Ptolemy may have established a Royal Mauretanian cult honoring himself and his late parents (see Berber mythology). One inscription is dedicated to his genius, and another inscription expressed wishes for his good health.

Evidence suggesting that Ptolemy could have deified JubaII after his death is from the writings of the Christian author of the 3rd century, Marcus Minucius Felix. In Felix's Octavius, the writer records a dialogue between a Christian and a pagan from Cirta. This dialogue was part of a Christian argument that divinity is impossible for mortals. Felix lists humans who were said to have become divine: Saturn, Jupiter, Romulus and Juba. Further literary evidence, suggesting the deification of JubaII by Ptolemy, is from the brief euhemerist exercise entitled On the Vanity of Idols by the 3rd-century Christian saint Cyprian. In his exercise in deflating the gods, Cyprian observed and stated that the Mauretanians were manifestly worshiping their kings and did not conceal their name by any disguise. According to the surviving evidence, there is a strong probability that JubaII and Ptolemy were deified by the Berbers after their deaths.

Coinage from Ptolemy's sole reign is different from those during the time Ptolemy co-ruled with JubaII. His royal title on coinage is in Latin ‘King Ptolemy’ and there is no surviving coinage that shows his royal title in Greek. On his coinage there is no Ancient Egyptian imagery. The coinage from his sole reign displays a variety of themes. Ptolemy personified himself as an elephant on coins. Elephant personification is an ancient coinage tradition in which his late parents partook when they ruled Mauretania. The elephant has symbolic functions: an icon representing Africa and an iconic monetary characteristic from the Hellenistic period which displays influence and power. Another animal Ptolemy uses on coins is a lion leaping, which is a symbol of animal kingship and is a symbol representing Africa.

Other coins display Roman themes. A rare revealing gold coin, dated from the year 39, celebrates Ptolemy's ascent, his rule, and his loyalty to Rome. On one side of the coin is a central bust of JubaII inscribed in Latin ‘King Juba son of Juba’. JubaII is personified like a Greek Egyptian pharaoh from the Ptolemaic dynasty. The other side of the coin is an eagle with its wings displayed on a thunderbolt, and Ptolemy's initials are inscribed in Latin. Through his father's central bust and inscription, Ptolemy is celebrating and showing the continuation of his family and rule, while honoring his paternal ancestry. Ptolemy through the eagle is celebrating the Roman Peace, honoring the rule of the Roman Empire, while he is showing his allegiance and loyalty to Ancient Rome. Another coin, dating from the year 40, celebrates his senatorial decree. The coin shows, on one side, a curule chair upon which is a wreath and has a sceptre leaning against it. On the other side of the coin, Ptolemy is wearing a fillet on his head.

Ptolemy seemed to have had expensive tastes and enjoyed luxury items. He owned a custom-made citrus wood wine table. Mauretania had many citrus trees and produced many citrus wood tables, which were frequently sought out by aristocrats and monarchs.

Ptolemy married a woman named Julia Urania, who came from obscure origins. She is only known through a funeral inscription found at Caesaria through her freedwoman Julia Bodina. Bodina ascribed Julia Urania as "Queen Julia Urania". There is a possibility that Julia Urania was a member of the royal family of Emesa (modern Homs, Syria). Ptolemy married Julia Urania at an unknown date during the 1st century. She bore Ptolemy, in about 38, a daughter called Drusilla.

Death
The Kingdom of Mauretania was one of the wealthiest Roman client kingdoms, and after 24, Ptolemy continued to reign without interruption. In late 40, Caligula invited Ptolemy to Rome and welcomed him with appropriate honours. Ptolemy was confirmed as king and an ally and friend of the empire, but he was assassinated by the order of Caligula. Caligula's motivation is unclear. Ancient historians claim envy of Ptolemy's wealth or a theatrical crowd's admiration of Ptolemy's purple cloak. Later historians have suggested other motivations. Some of these are inspired by Suetonius's claim about the purple cloak, while others are independent of the claims of the ancient historians, for example, the idea that Ptolemy may have been implicated in a plot by Gaetulicus or Caligula wanted to exert greater control over Mauretania.

After Ptolemy's murder in Rome, his former household slave Aedemon, from outrage and out of loyalty to his former master, took revenge against Caligula by starting the revolt of Mauretania with the Berbers against Rome. The Berber revolt was a violent one, and the rebels were skilled fighters against the Roman Army. The Roman generals Gnaeus Hosidius Geta and Gaius Suetonius Paulinus were needed to end the revolt. Mauretania was divided into two provinces, which were Mauretania Tingitana and Mauretania Caesariensis.

In popular culture

Ptolemy is a minor character in the novels by Robert Graves, I Claudius  and Claudius the God.

He appears in Stephanie Dray's novel Daughters of the Nile, which marked the end of the trilogy focusing on Ptolemy's mother.

Throughout Algeria and Morocco, statues have survived that belonged to Ptolemy. There is a nude statue of him, dated from the 1st century, which is on display at the Museum of History and Civilizations in Rabat, Morocco. His sculpted images are of a youthful appearance, and particularly those first portraits created during the reign of JubaII virtually show his relations to the Julio-Claudian dynasty. This is evident by the arrangement of the comma shaped locks over the forehead. There is a seven-inch fine bronze Roman imperial bust of Ptolemy about age 15 which Sotheby's auctioned in New York for $960,000 in 2004.

References

Citations

Bibliography 

 
 Tacitus, The Annals of Imperial Rome, Partner of my Labors
 Encyclopædia Britannica - Ptolemy of Mauretania
 Burstein, Stanley M. The Reign of Cleopatra, University of Oklahoma Press December 30, 2007 
 
 Nikos Kokkinos, Antonia Augusta: Portrait of a Great Roman Lady (London; New York: Routledge 1992)
 Michael Brett & Elizabeth Fentress, The Berbers, Blackwell Publishers 1997
 John Williams Humphrey, John Peter Oleson & Andrew N. Sherwood. Contributors: John Peter Oleson and Andrew N. Sherwood: Greek and Roman Technology: A Sourcebook: Annotated Translations of Greek Texts and Documents, Routledge 1998
 Mutilation and Transformation: Damnatio Memoriae and Roman Imperial, Brill 2004
 Christopher H. Hallett, The Roman Nude: Heroic Portrait Statuary 200 BC-AD 300, Oxford University Press, 2005

External links 
 ancient library article on Ptolemy
 coinage article and biography on Juba II and Cleopatra Selene II
 article on Cleopatra Selene II, Queen of Mauretania

10s BC births
40 deaths
1st-century BC Berber people
1st-century Berber people
1st-century disestablishments
1st-century executions
1st-century monarchs in Africa
Julii
Kings of Mauretania
People executed by the Roman Empire
People from Cherchell
Ptolemaic dynasty
Roman client rulers